Robert M. Place (born 1947) is an American artist and author known for his work on tarot history, symbolism, and divination.

Work as an artist
Place has worked since the 1970s as a sculptor, jeweler and illustrator.  His sculpture has been exhibited on the White House Christmas tree, in the New York State Museum, the Delaware Art Museum, and the Irish American Heritage Museum.  Place’s jewelry has been exhibited in the American Craft Museum, the Philadelphia Museum of Art, the Montclair Art Museum, the Summit Art Center, the International Wilhelm Muller Competition (which toured museums in Germany), the Birmingham Institute of Art and Design, and in numerous galleries in the United States, Ireland, Britain, and Japan.  He was awarded a 1984-85 New Jersey State Council on the Arts Fellowship  and the Niche Magazine award for outstanding achievement in metal sculpture in 1990 and 1991.

Work as tarot designer and author
In the 1990s, Place turned his attention as an illustrator to the creation of tarot decks and began his career as an author. Place is best known as the creator of The Alchemical Tarot, his first deck and book combination, which is illustrated in the style of 17th century alchemical engravings and which presents a parallel between the “great work” of alchemy, which leads to the creation of the philosopher’s stone and the allegory in the tarot’s trumps.

In his other decks, The Angels Tarot, The Tarot of the Saints, and The Buddha Tarot, Place has explored the connection between religion, mysticism, and the tarot’s symbolism.

In his fifth book, The Tarot: History, Symbolism, and Divination, his first book published not in connection with a tarot deck, Place contributed to the field of tarot history by discussing the images in the tarot in relation to the iconography of the 15th century Italian Renaissance, the era when the tarot was created.  Place relates each image in the tarot to similar images created at that time and presents a theory of interpretation that is rooted in the art and philosophy of the time.  The book also discusses contrasting occult theories and champions Pamela Colman Smith as the primary designer of the Waite–Smith tarot.

The Tarotpedia has said that The Tarot: History, Symbolism, and Divination “is bound to find a place amongst the most important works published this decade.”

"Booklist", the publication of the American Library Association, has said that The Tarot: History, Symbolism, and Divination “may be the best book ever written on that deck of cards decorated with mysterious images called the tarot.”

Robert Place has been a frequent lecturer on and teacher of Western mysticism and the history and use of the tarot. Besides teaching regularly at the New York Open Center since 1996 and at the Metropolitan Museum of Art in New York since 2009, he has taught at the World Tarot Congress, in Chicago and in Dallas; the Southeast Tarot Congress, in Florida; the New York Reader's Studio; The Third International Conference of the Association for Esoteric Studies, in Charleston; The Omega Institute, in New York; The New York Theosophical Society; Columbia University; The Museo Dei Tarocchi, in Riola, Italy; The Tarot Guild of Australia, Melbourne; Cartomancia, in Sao Paulo, Brazil; and he has given workshops in Los Angeles, Salt Lake City, Las Vegas; and since 2017, in Beijing, Shanghai, and Hangzhou, China. His lectures have appeared on the BBC, the Learning Channel, Discovery, and A&E.

In July, 2007, Place had the honor of cutting the ribbon at the grand opening of the Museo dei Tarocchi, in Riola, Italy.  Place was also the curator of an exhibition on the art and history of the tarot, which was held at the Los Angeles Craft and Folk Art Museum, from January 23, 2010, to May 9, 2010 and is the subject of his book, The Fool's Journey: the History, Art, & Symbolism of the Tarot. His facsimile of one of the earliest Italian Renaissance woodcut Tarots is included in the Metropolitan Museum of Art in New York.

Tarot and divination decks by Place
The Alchemical Tarot of Marseille, 
The Tarot of the Sevenfold Mystery 2nd Edition, 
The Alchemical Tarot: Renewed 5th Edition, 
The Tarot of the Alchemical Magnum Opus,  
An Ukiyo-e Lenormand,  
The Raziel Tarot: the Secret Teachings of Adam and Eve, 
 The Marziano Tarot, 
 The Hermes Playing Card Oracle, 
 The New York Lenormand
 The Burning Serpent Oracle, 
 Facsimile Italian Renaissance Woodcut Tarocchi
 The Tarot of the Sevenfold Mystery, 
 The Annotated Tarot of the Sevenfold Mystery, 
 The Vampire Tarot, 
 The Buddha Tarot, 
 The Tarot of the Saints, 
 The Angels Tarot
 The Alchemical Tarot: Renewed, Editions 2, 3, and 4, 
 The Alchemical Tarot: Art Edition
 The Alchemical Tarot,

Books
 The Tarot, Magic, Alchemy, Hermeticism, and Neoplatonism, Second Edition 2019,  
Alchemy and the Tarot: An Examination of the Historic Connection between Alchemy and the Tarot, with a Guide to The Alchemical Tarot, 2011, 
 The Fool's Journey: the History, Art, & Symbolism of the Tarot, 2010, 
 Mysteries, Legends, and Unexplained Phenomena Series: Magic and Alchemy, 2009, 
 The Vampire Tarot, 2009,  
 Mysteries, Legends, and Unexplained Phenomena Series: Shamanism, 2008,  
 Mysteries, Legends, and Unexplained Phenomena Series: Astrology and Divination, 2008, 
 The Tarot: History, Symbolism, and Divination, 2005, 
 The Buddha Tarot Companion: A Mandala of Cards, 2004, 
 A Gnostic Book of Saints, 2001, 
 The Angels Tarot, coauthored with Rosemary Ellen Guiley, 1995, 
 The Alchemical Tarot, coauthored with Rosemary Ellen Guiley, 1995,

References

External links
 
 The Museo dei Tarocchi – Italy Robert M. Place's workshop

Living people
Alchemy
American illustrators
American non-fiction writers
Tarotologists
1947 births
Date of birth missing (living people)
Place of birth missing (living people)